Pascal Bieler (born 26 February 1986) is a German football coach and former professional player. Bieler is currently the assistant of Borussia Dortmund II.

He was a left defensive back and he is a product of the Hertha BSC youth academy.

Coaching career
Four months after Bieler's arrival to Wuppertaler SV in the summer 2016, he retired and instead accepted a new role as assistant manager of the club's U19 squad. On 8 February 2018 the club announced, that U19 manager Christian Britscho had been promoted to the first team manager and Bieler would take charge of the U19 team as caretaker manager and would also be assistant manager for the first team. On 27 April 2018 it was confirmed, that Bieler would remain as manager of the U19 squad alongside his role as assistant manager for the first team.

After first team manager Adrian Alipour was fired on 25 March 2019, Bieler was appointed as caretaker manager for the rest of the season. In October 2019 he was replaced by Alexander Voigt. In January 2020 he became permanent manager of Wuppertaler SV on a short-term contract following Voigt's departure from the club.

In June 2020 he left Wuppertal to become an assistant at Borussia Dortmund II.

References

External links
 

Living people
1986 births
German footballers
Germany under-21 international footballers
Bundesliga players
2. Bundesliga players
3. Liga players
Regionalliga players
Hertha BSC players
Rot-Weiss Essen players
1. FC Nürnberg players
1. FC Nürnberg II players
SV Wehen Wiesbaden players
Würzburger Kickers players
Wuppertaler SV players
Association football defenders
Footballers from Berlin
Wuppertaler SV non-playing staff
Wuppertaler SV managers
Borussia Dortmund non-playing staff
German football managers